Bout Love is the seventh studio album by American R&B singer Bill Withers, released in 1979 on the Columbia label.

Reception

Bill Withers collaborated with Paul Smith on Bout Love, who co-wrote all but "Memories Are That Way" with Withers. Bout Love features Withers' usual mellowness and introspective lyrics, however its lead single, "Don't It Make It Better" is up-tempo, and its follow-up single, "You Got the Stuff" is a funk song. "Don't It Make It Better" peaked at No. 30 on Billboard R&B Singles, but "You Got the Stuff" reached only No. 85 on the chart.

Bout Love peaked at #50 on the R&B chart and No. 134 on the Billboard 200. It was re-released as a digital music download in 2008.

Track listing 
 "All Because Of You" (Bill Withers, Paul Smith) – 3:50
 "Dedicated To You My Love" (Withers, Smith) – 4:47
 "Don't It Make It Better" (Withers, Smith) – 4:12
 "You Got The Stuff" (Withers, Smith, Keith Hatchell) – 7:14
 "Look To Each Other For Love" (Withers, Smith) – 4:23
 "Love" (Withers, Smith) – 4:57
 "Love Is" (Withers, Smith) – 4:21
 "Memories Are That Way" (Withers) – 5:06

Personnel 
 Bill Withers – vocals, acoustic guitar (1), bass (1), whistle (2), guitar (3, 4, 7, 8), horn and string arrangements (3), acoustic piano (4), drums (8)
 Wah Wah Watson – electric guitar (1)
 Paul Smith – keyboards (1–7), synthesizer (1–4)
 Geoffrey Leib – keyboards (8)
 Clifford Coulter – synthesizer (8)
 Keni Burke – additional bass lIcks (1, 2), bass (3, 6, 7)
 Bryan Garofalo – bass (2, 5, 8)
 Jerry Knight – bass (3)
 Keith Hatchell – bass (4)
 Russ Kunkel – drums (1, 2, 3, 5–8), additional cymbal (8)
 Harvey Mason – drums (4)
 Ralph MacDonald – percussion (1, 5–8)
 Buddy Collette – flute solo (2)
 Bill Eaton – horn and string arrangements (1, 8), additional string arrangements (5, 6)
 Jeff Ervin – additional horn arrangements (1, 3)
 Jean Hintermann – additional horn arrangements (1, 3)
 Wade Marcus – horn arrangements (4–7), string arrangements (5, 6, 7)

Production 
 Paul Smith – producer
 Bill Eaton – production consultant 
 Gerry Griffith – production consultant 
 Ralph MacDonald – production consultant 
 Wade Marcus – production consultant 
 Bob Merritt – recording, mixing 
 Phil Jantaas – assistant engineer 
 Ollie Cotton – assistant engineer 
 Ed Rakowicz – assistant engineer 
 Andy Engel – design 
 Fred Anderson – photography

Charts

Singles

External links
 Bill Withers-'Bout Love at Discogs

References

1978 albums
Bill Withers albums
Columbia Records albums
Albums arranged by Wade Marcus
Albums produced by Paul Smith (pianist)